Thomas Paty (c.1713 – 4 May 1789) was a British surveyor, architect and mason working mainly in Bristol. He worked with his sons John Paty and William Paty.

Career
Thomas Paty came from a family of builders but little is known of his origins. He was responsible for building many of the 18th century buildings in Bristol, and his sons, John and William, joined the business. He and his family were involved in the parish life of St Augustine's Church and contributed to various charities. The business prospered and spread to South Gloucestershire, Wales and Somerset. It seems to have been successful at a time when other firms collapsed after the end of the Napoleonic Wars and many builders went out of business. They were also involved in the carving of monuments, some as far away as Bury St Edmunds and the West Indies, which allowed them to keep working throughout the winter. Thomas Paty was sometimes accused of a lack of originality, but during his lifetime, Bristol was transformed from a medieval city of wooden houses to a modern city with paved streets, stone buildings and suburbs.

Bristol Bridge
Between 1763 and 1769, James Bridges, and later Thomas Paty who replaced him when he resigned, were involved in the building of Bristol Bridge to replace a medieval structure over the floating harbour, the original course of the River Avon through Bristol. Both these men were described as surveyors, but they played no part in valuing the structures that were taken down, this being the responsibility of a group of master builders who often made use of the salvaged materials. Thomas Paty was the only one of the trustees of the bridge-building project who was in the building trade.

After the bridge was completed, Thomas Paty was involved in the rebuilding of St Nicholas Church which stood beside the end of the bridge. The trustees had set aside £1400 for this but the parish wanted a larger building, the wooden tower was discovered to be rotten and costs increased, the final sum being about £7000.

Works

The Exchange, Bristol (1741–43)
Monument to Rothesia Ann Barrington (died 1745); St. Andrew's parish church, Shrivenham, Berkshire
Monument to William Jones in Church of St Nicholas and the Blessed Virgin Mary, Stowey, Somerset
Royal Fort, Bristol (1758–61)
Fonmon Castle, Vale of Glamorgan (1762), with Thomas Stocking
Bristol Bridge (1763–69), with James Bridges
St Nicholas, Bristol (1763–69), with James Bridges
Theatre Royal, Bristol (1764–66)
Monument to Sir Robert Cocks (died 1765); St. Peter's parish church, Dumbleton, Gloucestershire
Monument to Thomas Esbury (died 1766); St. Mary's parish church, Hawkesbury, Gloucestershire
Monument to Edward Peach (died 1770); St. Mary's parish church, Woodchester, Gloucestershire
St Michael on the Mount Without, Bristol (1775–77)
Monument to John Nelems (died 1742, monument erected 1778); St. Mary the Virgin, Wotton-under-Edge, Gloucestershire
Plaque to the Fitzherbert family in the Church of St Mary and St Ethelbert, Luckington, Wiltshire
1–5 Beaufort Buildings, Bristol (1780)
Monument to Thomas Hobby (died 1781); St. Michael's parish church, Hill, Gloucestershire
Monument to Priscilla Thorne (died 1783); St James Church, Swimbridge, Devon
Monument to Samuel Peach (died 1785); St. Mary's parish church, Olveston, Gloucestershire
Monument to Arthur Tucker (died 1785); St. Michael's parish church, Winterbourne, Gloucestershire
3–10 Bath Street, Bristol (c. 1792)
Possibly Ston Easton Park, Somerset
Memorial to M. Humphrys in Church of St Peter, Langley Burrell, Wiltshire.

References

Sources

18th-century English architects
Architects from Bristol
History of Bristol
1710s births
1789 deaths